Monika Kobylińska (born 9 April 1995) is a Polish handball player for french league club Brest Bretagne and the Polish national team.

She competed at the 2015 World Women's Handball Championship in Denmark, the 2016 European Championship in Sweden, the 2017 World Championship in Germany, 2018 European Championship in France, the 2021 World Championship in Spain, and the 2022 European Championship in Slovenia, North Macedonia and Montenegro.

She is currently the captain of the Polish national team.

She previously played for GTPR Gdynia in Poland and TuS Metzingen in Germany.

Achievements

Club 
EHF Champions League:
 Finalist: 2021 (with Brest Bretagne Handball) 

French league (Division 1 Féminine):

 Winner : 2021 (with Brest Bretagne Handball) 
 Tied 1st: 2020 (with Brest Bretagne Handball) 
 Runner up: 2022 (with Brest Bretagne Handball)

French Cup (Coupe de France):

 Winner : 2021 (with Brest Bretagne Handball) 

Polish league:

 Winner : 2017 (with Vistal Gdynia)

Polish Cup (Puchar Polski):

 Winner : 2015 & 2016 (with Vistal Gdynia)

National team 

 World Championship
 4th: 2015

Carpathian Trophy:
Winner: 2017

Individual achievements 

 Top scorer of the Polish league - 2015/2016: 207 goals with GTPR Gdynia
 Second-best scorer of the Polish league - 2016/2017: 193 goals with GTPR Gdynia
 Rookies/Best Young Players of the 2015 World Championship (Under 22 year old): Best young right back

References

1995 births
Living people
Polish female handball players
People from Żary
Expatriate handball players
Polish expatriate sportspeople in Germany
21st-century Polish women